St John Beverley Groser  (23 June 1890 – 19 March 1966) was an English Anglican priest and prominent Christian socialist. Hannen Swaffer described him as "the best-known priest in the East End [of London]" and Kenneth Leech wrote that he was "one of the most significant Christian socialist figures in twentieth-century Britain".

Early life and education
Groser was born 23 June 1890 in Beverley, Western Australia, one of the English-born Phoebe (née Wainwright) and the American-born Thomas Eaton Groser's eleven children. His father was an Anglican missionary, serving as the local parish's rector and ministering to people on and around the cattle station where they lived. For the first fifteen years of his life, Groser's education consisted primarily of learning the life of a station hand. In 1905 he was sent to England for his academic education, attending Ellesmere College in Shropshire, a school of the Anglo-Catholic Woodard Foundation. He spent the summers on the estate of two women in Hertfordshire, where, as Kenneth Brill and Margaret 'Espinasse wrote, "His love of Britain and his acceptance of her imperial role were reinforced by the charm of upper-class life in a traditional style". Lacking any worldliness, having led a fairly secluded life in rural Australia, he "just took Imperialism for granted", as he would write in his memoir four decades later. He wrote:

After finishing at Ellesmere, Groser spent six years with the Community of the Resurrection, studying at the College of the Resurrection toward ordination as well one year at the University of Leeds. Despite the socialistic teaching at the college, he remained seemingly oblivious to the problems associated with imperialism until his first curacy.

Military career and curacies in Newcastle and Cornwall
Groser's first appointment after his diaconal ordination was a curacy in the slum parish of All Saints', Newcastle upon Tyne, from 1914 to 1919. He was ordained to the priesthood in 1915. It was during this period that Groser became a socialist.

Groser briefly served in the British Expeditionary Force and was sent to France as a chaplain to an infantry regiment during the First World War in 1915. Despite being a chaplain, he reluctantly agreed to lead combat troops during the war under pressure from his commanding officer Alan Hanbury-Sparrow, provided that he could remain unarmed. Years later, reflecting on Groser's initial refusal on the basis that it was wrong for a chaplain to have any role in the killing, Hanbury-Sparrow wrote:

Groser was mentioned in dispatches in 1917 and was sent home wounded in 1918 following the Battle of Passchendaele. He was awarded the Military Cross for his gallantry during the war in 1918. By this point, he was speaking publicly about his difficulty supporting the war effort, believing it to have been unnecessarily prolonged. Increasingly, he viewed the war as a crime against humanity and as being a result of capitalism.

After the war, Groser served as a messenger for the Church of England Men's Society to the dioceses of Carlisle, Durham, and Newcastle. In 1917 he was posted to a curacy at St Winnow's, Cornwall. Groser married Mary Agnes Bucknall, the daughter of his parish priest, in December of that year. They would go on to have four children together.

Ministry in London

In 1922 Groser was appointed curate of St Michael's, Poplar, in London's East End, initially serving under the vicar C. G. Langdon. Many of their parishioners were "dockers, the unemployed, ex-servicemen and others who lived in uncertain poverty". Groser worked alongside his fellow curate and brother-in-law Jack Bucknall. Groser and Bucknall lived next door to one another on Teviot Street and were actively involved in the Anglo-Catholic and revolutionary leftist organization Catholic Crusade with Conrad Noel. While the parish's three priests were all socialists, Groser and Bucknall were substantially more radical than the vicar. On 9 August 1924, Langdon served Groser (and likely Bucknall as well) six months' notice of their termination, saying "it was evident that they were not working together in a way which would advance the work of the parish and expressing deep regret that he saw no other way out of the situation." In the following months, Langdon was replaced as vicar, allowing the curates' departure to be postponed.

Groser was dismissed in 1927 due to his left-wing activism, but his licence to officiate was restored the following year when he was made priest-in-charge of Christ Church, Watney Street, Stepney. While in Stepney, he served as president of the Stepney Tenants' Defence League until his resignation in 1940. In 1936, the British Union of Fascists (BUF) planned a march through the East End (which then had a large Jewish population). The Jewish People's Council organised a petition, calling for the march to be banned, and gathered the signature of 100,000 East Londoners in two days. Groser was part of the community delegation which presented the petition to the Home Office. The petition was unsuccessful so a counter-demonstration was planned; the clashes between the anti-fascists, police and fascists becoming known as the Battle of Cable Street. Groser was present that day, was hit several time by police truncheons and suffered a broken nose.

Christ Church was destroyed in the Blitz in 1941, and Groser and his congregation transferred to St George in the East. He remained there until 1948, when he took up an appointment as warden of the Royal Foundation of St. Katharine. He was appointed chaplain to the Bishop of London after Henry Montgomery Campbell's translation to the see in 1956. Groser died at the Churchill Hospital, Oxford, in 1966, aged 75.

Outside of his priestly duties, Groser played Thomas Becket in the 1951 film Murder in the Cathedral, based on a play by T. S. Eliot. Writing for The New York Times, the reviewer Bosley Crowther praised his acting as "grandly dignified and benign".

Views
Groser was an Anglo-Catholic. Both his secondary school and divinity school were high-church institutions, and he was also influenced by the Catholic Crusade movement of Conrad Noel, a fellow Christian socialist. Groser advocated a return to the festivals, music, dancing, and processions of the medieval English church, and implemented that to some extent with his own congregations. He believed Christianity (and only Christianity) could establish a "new social ethic" and would produce radical social change. A Christian socialist, Groser was influenced by Marxism to some extent, particularly its view of class struggle. He was prominent in the anti-fascist movements of the 1930s.

As he supported a Labour election candidate over a Communist candidate, Groser left Catholic Crusade and, in 1931, founded the League of the Redemption. The league merged with the Socialist Christian League in 1933.

See also

 Diocese of London
 Ella Donovan
 George Lansbury
 Poplar, London
 Bertha Sokoloff

References

Citations

Works cited

Further reading

 
 

1890 births
1966 deaths
Military personnel from Western Australia
20th-century English Anglican priests
Alumni of the College of the Resurrection
Anglo-Catholic clergy
Anglo-Catholic socialists
Australian emigrants to England
Clergy from London
English activists
English Anglo-Catholics
English anti-fascists
English Christian socialists
English military chaplains
Independent Labour Party
People from Beverley, Western Australia
People from Limehouse
Recipients of the Military Cross
Protestant anti-fascists
Royal Army Chaplains' Department officers
World War I chaplains